Mazlan bin Mansor (Jawi: مصلان بن منصور; born 14 August 1960) is a retired Malaysian police officer who served as the Deputy Inspector-General of Police of Malaysia (DIG) under Inspector-General (IGP) Abdul Hamid Bador from May 2019 to his retirement in August 2020. He was the director of the Commercial Crimes Investigation Department (CCID) of the Royal Malaysia Police (PDRM) and had stints as police chief for various states ranging from Malacca, Negeri Sembilan and Selangor to the police commissioner of Sarawak.

Education
Mazlan is a graduate from Aberystwyth University with a Bachelor of Law (LL.B.) and holds a Malaysian Certificate in Legal Practice (CLP) which enables him to practice as a lawyer in Malaysia.

Career
Beginning August 2013, Mazlan served as deputy director of PDRM's Criminal Investigation Department (CID) in-charge of intelligence and operations.

In May 2016, Mazlan was transferred to the Malaysian Borneo state of Sarawak as its new police commissioner, taking over from Muhammad Sabtu Osman who returned as director of PDRM's Internal Security and Public Order Department (ISPOD). After slightly more than a year as Sarawak police commissioner, Mazlan was then appointed as Selangor police chief effective July 7, 2017 to replace Abdul Samah Mat who was about to retire.

Effective February 11, 2019, Mazlan was appointed to head PDRM's CCID as its director, taking over from acting director Saiful Azly Kamaruddin who was temporarily filling in for the retired Amar Singh Ishar Singh. He continued heading the Selangor police contingent for a brief period before his successor, Noor Azam Jamaludin, took over. Mazlan was elevated as DIG effective May 9, 2019 following the retirement of Noor Rashid Ibrahim, with acting DIG Abdul Hamid Bador assuming the post of IGP.

Mazlan went on mandatory retirement from the PDRM effective August 14, 2020, ending a 41-year career in the police force.

Honours
  :
  Commander of the Order of Loyalty to the Crown of Malaysia (PSM) – Tan Sri (2020)
 Royal Malaysia Police :
 Loyal Commander of the Most Gallant Police Order (P.S.P.P.) (2011)
 Courageous Commander of the Most Gallant Police Order (P.G.P.P.) (2020)
  :
 Companion Class I of the Order of Malacca (DMSM) – Datuk (2008)

  :
  Knight Companion of the Order of the Crown of Pahang (DIMP) – Dato’ (2008)

  :
  Commander of the Order of Cura Si Manja Kini (PCM) (2007)
  Knight Commander of the Order of Taming Sari (DPTS) – Dato’ Pahlawan (2017)

  :
  Knight Commander of the Order of the Crown of Selangor (DPMS) – Dato’ (2018)

References

1960 births
Living people
Malaysian police officers
People from Penang
Malaysian people of Malay descent
Malaysian Muslims
Alumni of Aberystwyth University
Commanders of the Order of Loyalty to the Crown of Malaysia
Knights Commander of the Order of the Crown of Selangor